The 2013 Eurocup Formula Renault 2.0 season was a multi-event motor racing championship for open wheel, formula racing cars held across Europe. The championship features drivers competing in 2 litre Formula Renault single seat race cars that conform to the technical regulations for the championship. The 2013 season is the 23rd Eurocup Formula Renault 2.0 season organized by the Renault Sport and the first season with the new generation car. The season began at Ciudad del Motor de Aragón on 27 April and finished on 20 October at Circuit de Barcelona-Catalunya. The series formed part of the World Series by Renault meetings at seven double header events.

Tech 1 Racing's Pierre Gasly won the championship title after wins at Moscow, Budapest and Le Castellet. His rival Oliver Rowland had the same number of wins and fought for the title until he received a drive-through penalty, as a result of a collision with Gasly in the final race of the season. ART Junior's Esteban Ocon took wins at Le Castellet and Barcelona to finish in third position in the drivers' standings. Nyck de Vries, Ignazio D'Agosto, Luca Ghiotto and Matthieu Vaxivière were also race-winners during the season. Gasly, with the help of Egor Orudzhev and Vaxivière, accrued enough points to confirm the teams' championship title for Tech 1 Racing.

Teams and drivers
On 7 November 2012, twelve teams were preselected for entry into the 2013 season, with BVM Racing and Atech Reid GP on the reserve list.

Race calendar and results
The calendar for the 2013 season was announced on 20 October 2012, the day before the end of the 2012 season. All seven rounds formed meetings of the 2013 World Series by Renault season.

Championship standings
 Points for both championships are awarded as follows:

Drivers' Championship

Teams' Championship

References

External links
 Renault-Sport official website

Eurocup Formula Renault 2.0
Eurocup
Renault Eurocup